Bertolotto is an Italian surname. Notable people with the surname include:

Marco Bertolotto (born 1959), Italian doctor and politician
Vincenzo Bertolotto (1912–1992), Italian rugby league and rugby union player

See also
Bertolotti
Bortolotto

Italian-language surnames